Karl William (born c. 1995) is a Danish alternative music singer and songwriter who is signed to the Danish ArtPeople label.

He caught attention with "Kostumeramt" as part of the Aarhus-based Hukaos collective made up of William, Tais and Louis Rustum with the track's appearance on the collective's EP release 1. sal. But it was with his EP Døende that he found chart success reaching number 8 on Tracklisten, the official Danish Albums Chart. The album was produced by Eloq (of Cheff Records), Tais (Hukaos collective), Carl Barsk and Emil Hesselbæk. "Foruden at forgude" and its accompanying music video is the second major song release after "Kostumeramt".

Discography

Albums / EPs

Singles

Appearances
2013: "Kostumeramt" (on Hukaos collective EP 1.sal)

References

External links
Facebook

Danish male singer-songwriters
1995 births
Living people
21st-century Danish  male singers